Gandicheruvu or Gandi Cheruvu is a village in Rangareddy district in Telangana, India. It falls under Hayathnagar mandal.

References

Villages in Ranga Reddy district